Alexis Martin (born May 14, 1994) is a French male acrobatic gymnast. With partner Camille Curti, Martin achieved 7th at the 2014 Acrobatic Gymnastics World Championships. With partner Chloe Gherardi, Martin came 6th at the 2016 Acrobatic Gymnastics World Championships.

References

External links 

 Alexis Martin at sport-folio.net

1994 births
Living people
French acrobatic gymnasts
Male acrobatic gymnasts